Mazhavilkoodaram (English: Rainbow Castle) (Malayalam:മഴവിൽകൂടാരം) is a 1995 Malayalam musical action film written and directed by Siddique Shameer, starring Rahman, Annie, Rajan P. Dev, Mala Aravindan, Idavela Babu, and  Zainuddin.

Plot
Jithu falls in love with his college mate Vinu. He thrashes a drug dealer to save his friend, but problems arise when he decides to take revenge against Jithu. The story deals with how he manages the situation.

Cast
 Rahman as Jithin Babu (Jithu)
 Annie as Binu
 Abi as Sobhan Kumar
 Idavela Babu as Supru
 Nandu as Subair
 Madhu Menon as Siby Jacob
 Shiju as Suresh
 Silk Smitha as Rathi Teacher
 Rajan P. Dev as Ram Saab
 Zainuddin as Principal
 Indrans as Sundareshan
 Mala Aravindan as Subair's Father
 Tony as a Politician
 Gayathri
 Gomathi Mahadevan as Jithin Babu's Mother
 Bindu Varappuzha as Subair's lover
 Lishoy as Police Officer
 Jagannatha Varma as Jithin Babu's Father
 Baburaj as Gunda
 Joju George as College Student

External links
 

1990s Malayalam-language films
Films based on Malayalam novels